In the design of DBMS, the identity map pattern is a database access design pattern used to improve performance by providing a context-specific, in-memory cache to prevent duplicate retrieval of the same object data from the database.

If the requested data has already been loaded from the database, the identity map returns the same instance of the already instantiated object, but if it has not been loaded yet, it loads it and stores the new object in the map. In this way, it follows a similar principle to lazy loading.

There are 4 types of identity maps
Explicit
Generic
Session
Class

See also 
 Active record
 Identity function
 Map (mathematics)
 Lazy loading

References 

Architectural pattern (computer science)
Articles with example C Sharp code
Software design patterns